Marco Antonio Rodriguez-Diaz, Jr.  (born June 19, 1980), better known by his stage name Infamous or DJ Infamous, is an American Grammy award winning record producer, and three time world champion winning DJ. Infamous, was a founding member of The-Allies DJ Crew (DJ Craze, DVLP and A-Trak) and is perhaps best known for his work with American rapper Lil Wayne. Infamous has produced songs for prominent recording artists such as Drake, Jay-Z, Meek Mill, Fat Joe, Nas, Game, Lupe Fiasco, Charlie Puth and Kendrick Lamar, among others. Although his current discography consists predominantly of rappers, Infamous is a multi-instrumentalist, who was once the guitar player and songwriter for rock band Antenna (formerly signed to Columbia Records), before meeting Lil Wayne.

DJ Titles
 1998 ITF USA DJ Champion
 1998 ITF World DJ Champion (2nd)
 1999 ITF Western Hemisphere Team Champion
 1999 ITF World Team DJ Champion
 1999 DMC USA Team DJ Champion
 1999 DMC World DJ Team (2nd)
 2000 ITF Western Hemisphere Beatjuggling Champion
 2000 ITF World Beatjuggling Champion
 2000 ITF World Advancement (3rd)
 2000 DMC USA Team Champion
 2001 Vestax Extravaganza (3rd)
 2001 DMC USA (3rd)
 2001 DMC World Team Champion (Perverted Allies)

Releases
Midget Madness (2002)

Business endeavors
 Tablist Magazine (Founder)
 Allstar Beatdown (Founder)
 Ammo Records (Co-Founder with Develop)

Production discography

Lil Wayne - Light Up My La La (2007)
 00. "Light Up My La La"

Lil Wayne - The Leak (2007)
 05. "Talkin Bout It" (produced with Develop)

Lil Wayne - Tha Carter III (2008)
 02. "Mr. Carter" (featuring Jay-Z) (produced with Drew Correa)
 14. "Playin With Fire" (featuring Betty Wright) (Guitars and keyboards by Infamous)

Fat Joe - The Elephant in the Room (2008)
 01. "The Fugitive"

LL Cool J - Exit 13 (2008)
 19. "Dear Hip Hop" (string arrangement by Infamous)

Ace Hood - Gutta (2008)
 13. "Top of the World"

Plies - Da Realist (2008)
 06. "Family Straight"

Jah Cure - The Universal Cure (2009)
 06. "Universal Cure"

Capone-n-Noreaga - Channel 10 (2009)
 11. "Beef" {Keys by Infamous)

Lil Wayne - Kobe Bryant (2009)
 00. "Kobe Bryant"

Fat Joe - J.O.S.E. 2 (2009)
 02. "Hey Joe"
 12. "Music"

Birdman - Priceless (2009)
 06. "Bring It Back" (feat. Lil Wayne)
 18. "Southside (Remix)" (feat. Lil Wayne, Rick Ross and Mack Maine)

Young Money Entertainment - We Are Young Money (2009)
 15. "Finale" (T-Streets, Gudda Gudda, Jae Millz, Tyga, Lil Chuckee, Lil Twist, Nicki Minaj, Shanell, Mack Maine, Drake and Lil Wayne) (produced with Onhel)

Lil Wayne - Rebirth (2010)
 02. "Prom Queen" (feat. Shanell)
 03. "Ground Zero"
 10. "One Way Trip" (feat. Kevin Rudolf)
 12. "The Price is Wrong"
 14. "I'm So Over You" (feat. Shanell)

Fat Joe - The Darkside Vol. 1 (2010)
 05. "Rappers are in Danger"
 04. "Kilos" (feat. Camron and Clipse)

Drake - I'm on My Way (2010)
 00. "I'm on My Way" (produced with Noah "40" Shebib)

Rick Ross - The Albert Anastasia EP (2010)
 01. "Diddy Speaks" (feat. Diddy)

Travis McCoy - Lazarus (2010)
 06. "Akidagain"

Lil Wayne - I Am Not a Human Being (2010)
 04. "I Am Not a Human Being"

Kid Sister - Fool's Gold Records Vol. 1 (2010)
 06. "Don't Stop Movin"

Nelly - 5.0 (2010)
 01. "I'm Number One" (feat. Birdman & DJ Khaled)
 16. "Giving her the Grind" (feat. Sean Paul)

Swizz Beatz - Monster Mondays Volume One (2011)
 07. "Hot Steppa #1" (feat. Eve)

Kool G Rap - Riches, Royalty, Respect (2011)
 15. "Harmony Homicide"

Lil Wayne - Tha Carter IV (2011)
 14. "President Carter"

The Game - California Republic (2012)
 14. "Skate On" (feat. Lupe Fiasco)

Lupe Fiasco - Food & Liquor II: The Great American Rap Album Pt. 1 (2012)
 13. "Form Follows Function"

Meek Mill - Dreams and Nightmares (2012)
 06. "Maybach Curtains" (feat. Nas, Rick Ross and John Legend)

Yo Gotti - Nov 19th: The Mixtape (2013)
 04. "Fuck You" (feat. Meek Mill)

Wrekonize - The War Within (2013)
 12. "Modern Man"

¡Mayday! - Believers (2013)
 05. "High Ride"
 07. "My Life"
 09. "Tear Shit Down"
 12. "Marathon Man"

Yo Gotti - I Am (2013)
 02. "Dont Come Around" (feat. Kendall Morgan)
 05. "F-U" (feat. Meek Mill)

Lil Wayne - Krazy (2014)
 00. "Krazy"

Vince Staples - Hell Can Wait (2014)
 02. "65Hunnid"

Yo Gotti - Concealed (2014)
 11. "11/11"

Viv & The Revival - The Introduction (2015)
 05. "Flash"

Lil Wayne - FWA (2015)
 01. "Glory" (produced with Avenue Beatz & Onhel)
 03. "I Feel Good" (produced with T@)
 07. "Psycho" (feat. Leah Hayes)
 09. "Thinking Bout You" (produced with T@)
 13. "Living Right" (feat. Wiz Khalifa) (produced with T@)
 14. "White Girl" (feat. Young Jeezy)

Yo Gotti - CM8 (2015)
 05. "Long Way" (feat. Big Sean)

Yo Gotti - The Return (2015)
 05. "Real Nigga Holiday" (produced with Ben Billions)

Black Violin - Stereotypes (2015)
 01. "Stereotypes"
 05. "Shaker"
 12. "Runnin"

Lil Wayne - Pour Up (2015)
 00. "Pour Up"

Belly - Up For Days (2015)
 10. "Who am I" (produced with Ben Billions)

Yo Gotti - Again (Single) (2016)
 01. "Again" (feat. LunchMoneyLewis) (produced with Ben Billions and JMIKE)

Charlie Puth - Nine Track Mind (2016)
 02. "Dangerously"

Yo Gotti - The Art of Hustle (2016)
 05. "General" (feat. Future) (produced with Ben Billions)

2 Chainz - ColleGrove (2016)
 03. "Bounce" (feat. Lil Wayne) (produced with T@)

Belly - Inzombia (2016)
 03. "Trap Phone" (feat. Jadakiss)
 09. "Seven Day Love" (feat. Ashanti) (produced with Ben Billions and Belly)

Yo Gotti - CM9 (2016)
 12. "What Happened" (produced with Ben Billions)

Belly - Another Day in Paradise (2016)
 01. "It's all Love" (feat. Starrah)

G-Eazy - Fast and Furious 8 (2017)
 03. "Good Life" (feat. Kehlani) (produced with DJ Frank E, Ben Billions, Evigan and Danny Majic)

Yo Gotti - Top Down (2017)
 00. "Top Down"(feat. Meek Mill) (produced with Ben Billions)

Kevin Gates - What If (2017)
 00. "What If" (produced with Ben Billions)

Kodak Black  - Project Baby 2 (2017)
 01. "Codeine Dreamin" (feat. Lil Wayne) (produced with Ben Billions and Schife Karbeen)

Lil Wayne - Dedication 6 Reloaded (2018)
 01. "For Nothing"

Kodak Black  - Heart Break Kodak (2018)
 05. "Codeine Dreamin" (feat. Lil Wayne) (produced with Ben Billions and Schife Karbeen)
 09. "I Get Lonely"

Kid Cudi - Rampage (2018)
 00. "The Rage" (feat. Smashing Pumpkins) (produced with Ben Billions and Dot Da Genius)

Lil Wayne - Tha Carter V (2018)
 08. "Mona Lisa" (feat. Kendrick Lamar)
10. "Open Letter"
15. "Took His Time"
19. "Mess"
22. "Used 2"

Lil Wayne & Ty Dolla - Spider-Man: Into the Spider-Verse (2018)
 08. "Scared of the Dark" (feat. XXXTENTACION)

Lil Wayne & Ty Dolla - Spider-Man: Into the Spider-Verse (2019)
 00. "Scared of the Dark" Remix (feat. XXXTENTACION & Ozuna)

Plan B - First Past The Post (2019)
 00. "First Past The Post”

Lil Wayne - Funeral (2020)
 06. "Stop Playin with me"

Lil Wayne - Tha Carter V Deluxe (2020)
 03. "More To The Story" Ft. Raekwon

Lil Wayne - No Ceilings (2020)
 06. "Kobe Bryant"

Gashi - Butterflies (2020)
 02. "Madness"

Lunchmoney Lewis - Oceans (2021)
 00. "Oceans” ft. Meghan Trainor

Belly - See You Next Wednesday (2021)
 05. "Moment of silence"

Rick Ross - Richer Than I ever Been (2021)
 09. "Outlawz" ft. Jazmine Sullivan and 21 savage

Film scores

Magic City Memoirs (2011)
Heat Nation (2014)

References

External links
 official myspace

Living people
American people of Cuban descent
Musicians from Miami
American hip hop DJs
American hip hop record producers
Rap rock musicians
1980 births
American hip hop musicians
Southern hip hop musicians
Songwriters from Florida